The 2010–11 Tampa Bay Lightning season was the team's 19th season in the National Hockey League (NHL). For the first time since the 2006–07 season, the Lightning qualified for the Stanley Cup playoffs.

Pre-season
On May 25, 2010, the Lightning announced Hockey Hall of Fame player and former Detroit Red Wings executive Steve Yzerman as their new general manager. On June 9, 2010, Yzerman hired Guy Boucher, head coach of the American Hockey League (AHL)'s Hamilton Bulldogs, as the Lightning's new head coach.

Regular season 
In October, the Lightning compiled a 7–2–1 record and with 15 points, leading not only the Southeast Division, but also the entire Eastern Conference. This was the first time the Lightning had ever led the East after the first month of the season. Steven Stamkos was named one of the League's Three Stars for the month of October, with Stamkos himself coming away with the honor of First Star. Stamkos led the League with 19 points, scoring nine goals and assisting on ten, and was tied for the second-best plus-minus rating at +9.

The Lightning's record started to slide in November, as they earned only three points in their first seven games of the month. On November 11, Vincent Lecavalier suffered a fracture to his right hand. He underwent surgery on November 15 and was placed on the injured reserve list, expected to miss four-to-five weeks. He would ultimately return one month later on December 15, having missed 15 games. Despite losing their captain, the Lightning were able to win six of the month's final nine games, a stretch that included a streak of five consecutive wins. With a 14–8–3 record and 31 points, the Lightning fell to second place in the Division and fifth in the Conference.

On January 1, 2011, Nate Thompson scored just 19 seconds into the overtime period to give the Lightning a 2–1 home win over the New York Islanders. It would prove to be the fastest overtime goal scored during the 2010–11 regular season.

The Lightning scored the fewest shorthanded goals in the league with just one, and allowed the most shorthanded goals in the league with 16.

Playoffs
After defeating the Pittsburgh Penguins 2–1 on March 31, the Lightning clinched a playoff spot for the first time since the 2006–07 season. They defeated the Penguins in the first round, 4–3, and swept the top-seeded Washington Capitals in the second round. However, the Lightning lost in the Conference Final to the Boston Bruins 4–3.

Post-season

Standings

Divisional standings

Conference standings

Schedule and results

Pre-season

Regular season

Playoffs

Player stats

Skaters
Note: GP = Games played; G = Goals; A = Assists; Pts = Points; +/− = Plus/minus; PIM = Penalty minutes

Goaltenders
Note: GP = Games played; TOI = Time on ice (minutes); W = Wins; L = Losses; OT = Overtime losses; GA = Goals against; GAA= Goals against average; SA= Shots against; SV= Saves; Sv% = Save percentage; SO= Shutouts

†Denotes player spent time with another team before joining Lightning. Stats reflect time with Lightning only.
‡Traded mid-season
Bold/italics denotes franchise record

Awards and records

Awards

Records

Milestones

Transactions 

The Lightning have been involved in the following transactions during the 2010–11 season.

Trades

Notes

Free agents acquired

Free agents lost

Claimed via waivers

Lost via waivers

Player signings

Draft picks 

Tampa Bay will pick at the 2010 NHL Entry Draft in Los Angeles, California.

See also 
 2010–11 NHL season

Farm teams

Norfolk Admirals 
The Lightnings' American Hockey League affiliate will remain to be the Norfolk Admirals in the 2010–11 season.

Florida Everblades 
The Florida Everblades of the ECHL and the Lightning entered a one-year affiliation agreement for the 2010–11 season on July 29, 2010.

References 

Tampa Bay Lightning seasons
T
T
Tamp
Tamp